Gaston Bauer (31 January 1936 – 9 April 1994) was a Luxembourgian footballer. He played in nine matches for the Luxembourg national football team from 1959 to 1961.

References

External links
 

1936 births
1994 deaths
Luxembourgian footballers
Luxembourg international footballers
Place of birth missing
Association football midfielders
Union Luxembourg players
CA Spora Luxembourg players